Gonin ( or, in some English-language editions, The Five) is a 1995 crime film directed by Takashi Ishii and starring Takeshi Kitano, Kōichi Satō and Masahiro Motoki. This was the first film Kitano starred in after his 1994 motorcycle accident. The eyepatch the character wears was because his right eye was still leaking fluids.

Summary
Bandai (Sato) is a disco owner whose business, following the collapse of Japan's bubble economy, is slowly disintegrating, and who owes debts he cannot possibly pay to the local Yakuza. His solution is to rob the gangsters, for which purpose he assembles a team consisting of other casualties of the economic downturn—including a gay hustler (Motoki) who frequents his club, a down-on-his-luck ex-cop (Jinpachi Nezu), an unbalanced salaryman (Naoto Takenaka), and a Thai pimp (Kippei Shiina). The hastily planned heist goes off awkwardly, and the Yakuza start tracking down the conspirators, hiring a team of hitmen (Kitano and Kazuya Kimura) to take out the thieves.

Cast
 Kōichi Satō as Mikihiko Bandai
 Masahiro Motoki as Junichi Mitsuya
 Jinpachi Nezu as Kaname Hizu
 Kippei Shiina as Jimmy 
 Naoto Takenaka as Shohei Ogiwara
 Megumi Yokoyama as Nammy
 Eiko Nagashima as Saki
 Maiko Kawakami as Hostess at Pinky
 Hideo Murota as Shikine
 Kazuya Kimura as Kazuma Shibata
 Shingo Tsurumi as Shigeru Hisamatsu
 Toshiyuki Nagashima as Yasumasa Ogoshi
 Takeshi Kitano as Ichiro Kyoya

References

External links
 
 
  Gonin at the Japanese Movie Database

1995 films
1995 crime drama films
1995 crime thriller films
1990s heist films
Films directed by Takashi Ishii
Japanese crime drama films
Japanese crime thriller films
1990s Japanese-language films
Japanese heist films
Yakuza films
1990s Japanese films